Aglaia australiensis is a species of plant in the family Meliaceae. It is endemic to Australia.

References

australiensis
Flora of Queensland
Sapindales of Australia
Vulnerable flora of Australia
Vulnerable biota of Queensland
Taxonomy articles created by Polbot